Tenino may refer to

 Tenino, Washington, a city in the U.S. state of Washington
 Tenino people, a Native American tribe of the Pacific Northwest, also known as the Warm Springs bands
 The Tenino, a Columbia River sternwheeler in the United States